Võiste is a small borough in Häädemeeste Parish, Pärnu County Estonia.

References 

Boroughs and small boroughs in Estonia